Glotzer is a surname. Notable people with the surname include:

Albert Glotzer (1908–1999), American stenographer and socialist politician
Sharon Glotzer, American scientist

See also
Glatzer